Miramor, is a district in Daykundi province in central Afghanistan. It was created in 2005 from former Shahristan district.

References

External links 
 Summary of District Development Plan, 2007

Districts of Daykundi Province
Hazarajat